The 1977 Western Kentucky football team represented Western Kentucky University during the 1977 NCAA Division II football season. Led by tenth-year head coach Jimmy Feix, the Hilltoppers compiled an overall record of 1–8–1 with a mark of 1–5–1 in conference play, placing last out of eight teams in the OVC. The team's captains were Chip Carpenter and Biff Madon.

Schedule

References

Western Kentucky
Western Kentucky Hilltoppers football seasons
Western Kentucky Hilltoppers football